The 1954–55 Boston Bruins season saw the Bruins finish in fourth place in the National Hockey League (NHL) with a record of 23 wins, 26 losses, and 21 ties for 67 points. In the playoffs, they lost the semi-finals to the Montreal Canadiens in five games.

Regular season

Final standings

Record vs. opponents

Schedule and results

Player statistics

Forwards
Note: GP = Games played; G = Goals; A = Assists; Pts = Points; PIM = Penalty minutes

Defencemen
Note: GP = Games played; G = Goals; A = Assists; Pts = Points; PIM = Penalty minutes

Goaltending
Note: GP= Games played; W= Wins; L= Losses; T = Ties; SO = Shutouts; GAA = Goals against average

Awards and records

Fernie Flaman, Defence, NHL Second Team All-Star

References

Boston Bruins seasons
Boston Bruins
Boston Bruins
Boston Bruins
Boston Bruins
1950s in Boston